Philiris agatha is a species of butterfly of the family Lycaenidae. It is endemic to  Papua New Guinea.

References

Butterflies described in 1899
Luciini
Taxa named by Henley Grose-Smith